Bowcock is a surname. Notable people with the surname include:

 Benny Bowcock (1879–1961), American baseball player
 Philip Bowcock (born 1968), English accountant and executive

See also
 Bocock
 Boocock